Feixian railway station is a third-class railway station in Feicheng Subdistrict, Fei County, Linyi, Shandong on the Yanzhou–Shijiusuo railway. It was built in 1984 and is under the jurisdiction of China Railway Jinan Group.

References 

Railway stations in Linyi
Stations on the Yanzhou–Shijiusuo railway
Railway stations in China opened in 1984